The 1992 LSU Tigers football team represented Louisiana State University in the 1992 NCAA Division I-A football season.  LSU finished with a 2–9 overall record (1–7 in SEC play), the lowest winning percentage in school history. The team played their home games at Tiger Stadium in Baton Rouge, Louisiana. They were coached by head coach Curley Hallman, whose two year record stood at 7–15.

Schedule

Roster

References

LSU
LSU Tigers football seasons
LSU Tigers football